, stylized as Yu-Gi-Oh! SEVENƧ, is a Japanese anime series animated by Bridge that aired in Japan on TV Tokyo from April 4, 2020, to March 27, 2022. It is the seventh main anime series in the Yu-Gi-Oh! franchise, following Yu-Gi-Oh! VRAINS and commemorates the 20th anniversary of the Yu-Gi-Oh! Duel Monsters anime series. It is also the first installment in the series to not be animated by Gallop.

The series is succeeded by Yu-Gi-Oh! Go Rush!!, which premiered on April 3, 2022.

Synopsis

The series takes place in the futuristic town of Goha and stars Yuga Ohdo, a fifth-grade, elementary school student, who loves both inventions and dueling. Feeling that the current rules of the Duel Monsters card game are too stifling, Yuga successfully manages to install a new set of rules of his own creation known as "Rush Duel", allowing for more fast-paced and frantic dueling. The series follows Yuga and his friends as they show off the delights of Rush Duels while under the watchful eye of the Goha Corporation that oversees the city.

Media

Anime

Yu-Gi-Oh! Sevens was first announced as a then-untitled new anime series in the Yu-Gi-Oh! franchise on July 21, 2019. The series marked the second studio turnover in franchise history with Bridge taking over as head studio in animation production from Gallop, which oversaw every television series and films in the franchise beginning with Yu-Gi-Oh! Duel Monsters in 2000. The series is being directed by Nobuhiro Kondo with screenplay by Toshimitsu Takeuchi and character designs by Kazuko Tadano and Hiromi Matsushita. It began airing in Japan on April 4, 2020, on TV Tokyo.

On April 28, 2020, it was announced that after episode 5, the remaining episodes would be delayed for five weeks due to the effects of the COVID-19 pandemic. On July 10, 2020, it was announced it will be delayed again due to the aforementioned pandemic and resumed on August 8, 2020. An edited English dub began production in early 2021, and premiered on Disney XD on June 6 and Hulu on June 7, 2022, in the United States.

Manga
A comedy spin-off manga adaptation, titled Yu-Gi-Oh! Sevens: Boku no Road Gakuen (My Road Academy), written and illustrated by Megumi Sasaki launched in the September issue of Saikyo Jump on August 4, 2020.

On August 19, 2020, it was announced that Yu-Gi-Oh! Sevens will be getting a manga in V Jump, titled , written by Hikokubo Masahiro and illustrated by Sugie Tasuku that launched in the next issue of V Jump on September 19, 2020.

Trading Card Game

In the year that Yu-Gi-Oh! Sevens premiered, the Yu-Gi-Oh! Trading Card Game announced an update to the Master Rules, unofficially called "Master Rule 5". Effective April 1, 2020, it is now possible again to summon Fusion, Synchro, or Xyz monsters directly to the Main Monster zones without a required Link arrow pointing to it. Pendulum and Link monsters, however, retain their previous rules. Furthermore, several alterations to card rulings were made to the OCG, exclusively.

No new card mechanics were introduced into the main card game. Instead, a new format separate from the main game was introduced exclusively for the Japanese and Korean market named Rush Duels. Normal Summoning is unlimited, though Tribute Summon rules for Level 5 or higher monsters still apply. All card effects are "soft" once per turn, meaning a card's effect can be used once per copy. If a player can summon or use another copy of the same card, they may use its effect again. Card effects are now sectioned into "Requirement" and "Effect" boxes for easier reading. Players can only use cards designed for Rush Duels, which have a special frame and a "RUSH DUEL" tag at the bottom of the card. Rush Duels also uses its own exclusive card pool with many cards not found in the main game. Certain imported cards from the main game are known as "Legend Cards". Each player is allowed one copy of one Legend Card in their deck.

Following a rule update in January 2023, unofficially called "Rush Master Rule 2", players are now allowed to use one Legend card per Card Type in a deck (one Spell, one Trap, and one Monster).

Reception
Critic reception for Yu-Gi-Oh! Sevens is mixed. Mellisa Camacho wrote for Common Sense Media that younger kids "may find what's happening a little confusing at times" but the anime is "lively enough to be entertaining." She gave a rating of 3 out of 5 stars.

References

External links
 Yu-Gi-Oh! Sevens Official website at TV Tokyo 
 Yu-Gi-Oh! Sevens at Twitter 
 

Anime spin-offs
Bridge (studio)
School life in anime and manga
Shōnen manga
Shueisha manga
TV Tokyo original programming
Yu-Gi-Oh!
Yu-Gi-Oh!-related anime